Beatriz Hatz (born October 7, 2000) is an American Paralympic athlete who competes in long jump and sprinting events at international track and field competitions. She was born without a fibula in her right leg and had the limb amputated below the knee when she was ten months old, she has also had surgical operations to straighten her knees.

Hatz began her athletic career when she encouraged by a friend to take part in track and field. She was named US Paralympic High School Athlete of the Year in 2018.

References

2000 births
Living people
Sportspeople from Littleton, Colorado
People from Lakewood, Colorado
Paralympic track and field athletes of the United States
American female sprinters
American female long jumpers
Athletes (track and field) at the 2020 Summer Paralympics
Medalists at the 2019 Parapan American Games
21st-century American women